is a 2018 Japanese film adaptation of a manga series of the same name by Naoshi Komi. It is directed by Hayato Kawai, distributed by Toho, and stars Kento Nakajima and Ayami Nakajo as Raku Ichijo and Chitoge Kirisaki respectively. It was released in Japan on December 21, 2018. The theme song of the film, KawaE by Yabai T-shirts Yasan. This Live-action movie was released across 294 theaters in Japan.

Plot 
Raku Ichijo is in high school. He does not like violence and is studying to fulfil his aspiration to serve the public. Chitoge Kirisaki is a transfer student and new to the school. She accidentally knocks Raku down. Normally, that would be that; except each is respectively the son and daughter of local Yakuza gang members. There is going to be trouble unless they act as if they are going steady. It is not going to be easy because they dislike one another.

Cast
 Kento Nakajima as Raku Ichijo
 Ayami Nakajo as Chitoge Kirisaki
 Natsumi Ikema as Kosaki Onodera
 Haruka Shimazaki as Marika Tachibana 
 Kaede Aono as Seshirō Tsugumi 
 Yūta Kishi as Shū Maiko: Raku's best friend.
 Hana Kawamura as Ruri Miyamoto: Kosaki's best friend.
 DAIGO as Claude: Chitoge's bodyguard.
 Marika Matsumoto as Kyoko Hihara: The homeroom teacher of Raku's classroom.

References

External links
 
  

2018 films
2010s high school films
2018 romantic comedy-drama films
Gangs in fiction
2010s Japanese-language films
Japanese romance films
Japanese romantic comedy-drama films
Japanese teen films
Live-action films based on manga
Toho films
Yakuza films
Films shot in Chiba Prefecture
Films shot in Saitama Prefecture
Films shot in Tochigi Prefecture
Films shot in Ibaraki Prefecture
Films shot in Kanagawa Prefecture
Films shot in Gunma Prefecture
Films shot in Shizuoka Prefecture
Films shot in Tokyo
2010s Japanese films